Dogg Food is the debut studio album by American hip hop duo Tha Dogg Pound, released on Halloween 1995. Its controversial lyrics were the subject of shareholder protest. The album was supposed to be released in July 1995, but as a result of the controversy from Time Warner, the release was delayed by three months. Two singles were released from the album: "Let's Play House" (featuring Michel'le and Nate Dogg) and "New York, New York" (featuring Snoop Doggy Dogg).

It peaked at #1 on the Billboard 200 chart on November 18, 1995. The album sold 278,000 copies in its first week. It is one of the last high-selling and critically acclaimed releases from the label, preceding only Tha Doggfather and Tupac's releases as an anticipated album, and is the last to be "officially" produced under the G-funk era of hip-hop, with Death Row Records' future releases diverging from the style. Though Dr. Dre was Death Row's top producer, the album was mostly produced by Daz Dillinger, while Dre mixed the album. Dogg Food led the way for Daz to become the top in-house producer for Death Row until his departure in the late 1990s.

The video for the first single, "New York, New York", caused some controversy when Snoop appeared in it kicking down buildings throughout New York. The trailer of Tha Dogg Pound was shot at during the process of making the "New York, New York" video although no one was injured. The song is one of three tracks on the album not produced by Daz, as DJ Pooh provided the beat.

Critical reception
The Encyclopedia of Popular Music wrote that the album "revealed a comparative deftness of touch and a penchant for self-parody largely lacking in [the group's] more esteemed colleagues." The Washington Post opined that Tha Dogg Pound's "variation on what has become a stale formula is less sample-driven than most gangsta funk; instead, it focuses on the formidable verbal flow and rhyme skills of Daz and Kurupt." The Baltimore Sun wrote that "the music here sounds wonderfully fresh, from the growling synth-bass of 'Smooth' to the dreamy, slightly tropical pulse of 'Big Pimpin' 2'." Trouser Press called the album "a low-key, unambitious and only mildly imaginative replay of Doggystyle, rolling over familiar G-funk terrain with the same minimum of venom and violence."

Track listing

Notes
"Dogg Pound Gangstaz" features vocals by Snoop Dogg and Big Pimpin
"Respect" features vocals by Nancy Fletcher, Big Pimpin, and Prince Ital Joe with additional vocals by Dr. Dre
"New York, New York" features vocals by Snoop Dogg
"Smooth" features vocals by Val Young, Kevin 'Slow Jammin' James, and Ricky Harris
"Cyco-Lic-No (Bitch Azz Niggaz)" features vocals by Snoop Dogg
"Ridin', Slipin' and Slidin" features vocals by Mz. South 'Sentral and background vocals by Kevin 'K.V.' Varnado 
"Big Pimpin 2" features vocals by Big Pimpin and additional vocals by Dr. Dre
"Let's Play House" features vocals by Nate Dogg and additional vocals by Dr. Dre and Snoop Dogg
"I Don't Like to Dream About Gettin Paid" features additional vocals by Stacey Smallie and Rochelle Wright
"If We All Fucc" features vocals by Snoop Dogg
"Some Bomb Azz Pussy" features vocals by Snoop Dogg, Big C-Style, and Joe Cool
"A Doggz Day Afternoon" features vocals by Nate Dogg and Snoop Dogg

Sample credits
"Intro" samples "The Shalimar" by The Last Poets
"Dogg Pound Gangstaz" samples "No Where 2 Hide" by DJ Pooh feat. Threat & Val Young
"Respect" interpolates "Afro Puffs (extended remix)" by The Lady of Rage feat. Dr. Dre & Snoop Dogg and "Flash Light" by Parliament
"New York, New York" samples "You're a Customer" by EPMD, "I Can't Dance" by Genesis and interpolates "New York, New York" by Grandmaster Flash & the Furious Five
"Smooth" samples "Batterram" by Toddy Tee, "Tha Shiznit" by Snoop Dogg, and interpolates "La Di Da Di" by Doug E. Fresh and Slick Rick
"Cyco-Lic-No (Bitch Azz Niggaz)" interpolates "Aqua Boogie (A Psychoalphadiscobetabioaquadoloop)" by Parliament
"Big Pimpin' 2" samples "Big Pimpin'" by Tha Dogg Pound
"I Don't Like to Dream About Gettin' Paid" samples "Love Will Find a Way" by Lionel Richie and interpolates Paid in Full by Eric B. & Rakim

Charts

Weekly charts

Year-end charts

Certifications

See also
1995 in music
List of albums
List of number-one albums of 1995 (U.S.)
List of number-one R&B albums of 1995 (U.S.)

References

External links
[ Billboard]
MusicMatch
Music Video Database

1995 debut albums
Tha Dogg Pound albums
Death Row Records albums
Albums produced by DJ Pooh
Albums produced by Daz Dillinger
Gangsta rap albums by American artists
G-funk albums